Roman Mikhailovich the Old (c. 1218 – after 1288 ) was a Rus' prince (a member of the Rurik dynasty). He was prince of Chernigov (1246/1247 – after 1288), and of Bryansk (1246 – after 1288).

Biography
Roman was the second son of Mikhail Vsevolodovich (who later became prince of Chernigov, and grand prince of Kiev) by his wife, Elena Romanovna (or Maria Romanovna), a daughter of prince Roman Mstislavich of Halych. His mother most likely persuaded her husband to name their second son after her father. Around 1243, Roman’s elder brother, Rostislav Mikhailovich was disowned by their father when he decided to stay in Hungary.

On September 20, 1246, Mikhail Vsevolodovich was executed by the Tatars; Roman’s patrimony was Bryansk which controlled the water routes from Chernihiv (today Chernihiv in Ukraine) to Smolensk and across the Vyatichi lands to Suzdalia. The Lyubetskiy sinodik and the Ermolinskiy Chronicle identify him as the prince of Chernihiv. In the light of Batu Khan’s directive that only those princes who submitted to him would receive a yarlik (a patent), Roman obviously visited the khan after his father’s execution. The chronicles do not report his visit, but John de Plano Carpini alludes to it.

If, as is most likely the case, this reference was to Roman, Batu Khan gave him the yarlik not only for his patrimonial domain of Bryansk, but also for Chernihiv. On the other hand, other chronicles never refer to Roman as the prince of Chernigov. Available evidence suggests that, even though he held the yarlik for Chernihiv, the town was probably occupied by Batu Khan’s official (baskak), who requisitioned it for himself; therefore Roman was merely the titular prince of Chernigov. Nevertheless, he was probably instrumental in having the bishop of Chernigov transferred to Bryansk.

Under the year 1264, the Hypatian Chronicle reports that Roman of Bryansk sent his eldest son, Mikhail Romanovich to escort Olga Romanovna, one of his sisters, to her betrothed, Vsevolod Vasilkovich of Volhynia. 10 years later the same chronicler states that Khan Mengu-Timur ordered a number of princes, including “Roman of Debryansk” (i.e. Bryansk) and his son Oleg Romanovich, to campaign against the Lithuanians.

In 1288, according to an account of the foundation of the Uspenskiy Svenskiy Monastery in Bryansk, Roman became blind and was cured through the intervention of an icon of the Mother of God. In thanksgiving for his cure, he founded the Uspenskiy Monastery near the Desna River.

According to some accounts, the Tatars killed him at the Golden Horde.

Marriage and children
#: Anna
Prince Oleg Romanovich of Chernigov and Bryansk;
Mikhail Romanovich;
Olga Romanovna (Elena Romanovna), wife of Prince Vsevolod Vasilkovich of Volhynia.

Ancestors

Footnotes

Sources
Dimnik, Martin: The Dynasty of Chernigov - 1146-1246; Cambridge University Press, 2003, Cambridge; .
DiPlano Carpini, Giovanni (Author) - Hildinger, Erik (Translator): The Story of the Mongols whom We Call the Tartars; Branden Publishing Company, Inc, 1996, Boston, MA; .

1210s births
1280s deaths
Olgovichi family
Princes of Chernigov
Murdered Russian monarchs
Eastern Orthodox monarchs
13th-century murdered monarchs